Echo Valley may refer to;

Canada
 Echo Valley, British Columbia, an area in the Cariboo Region
 Echo Valley Airport, a private landing strip for Echo Valley Ranch & Spa, British Columbia
 Echo Valley Conference Centre, Fort San, Saskatchewan
 Echo Valley Provincial Park, Saskatchewan

Denmark
 Echo Valley (Bornholm) or Ekkodalen, Denmark's longest rift

Philippines
 Echo Valley, an area of Sagada, Mountain Province

United States
 Echo Valley (California), a valley in Yosemite National Park
 Echo Valley Ski Area, near Chelan, Washington